James Edward Kremers (born October 8, 1965) is a former catcher in Major League Baseball. He played for the Atlanta Braves in 1990.

In February, 1991, Kremers was traded to the Montreal Expos for Otis Nixon, who would go on to steal 72 bases for the Braves as they won the 1991 National League pennant. Kremers played five more years in the minor leagues but never again reached the majors. He retired after the 1995 season.

Kremers played college baseball at the University of Arkansas.

References

External links

1965 births
Living people
Major League Baseball catchers
Atlanta Braves players
Baseball players from Arkansas
Sportspeople from Little Rock, Arkansas
El Paso Diablos players
Greenville Braves players
Indianapolis Indians players
New Orleans Zephyrs players
Ottawa Lynx players
Portland Sea Dogs players
Richmond Braves players
Sumter Braves players
American expatriate baseball players in Canada